Treene was an Amt ("collective municipality") in the district of Nordfriesland, in Schleswig-Holstein, Germany. It was situated between Husum and the Eider River. Its seat was in Mildstedt. In January 2008, it was merged with the Ämter Friedrichstadt, Nordstrand and Hattstedt to form the Amt Nordsee-Treene.

The Amt Treene consisted of the following municipalities:

Former Ämter in Schleswig-Holstein